Carlos De León, also known as "Sugar" De Leon, (May 3, 1959 – January 1, 2020) was a Puerto Rican boxer who made history by becoming the first cruiserweight to win the world title twice.  Subsequently, he kept breaking his own record for the most times as cruiserweight champion by regaining the title on two further occasions.

Career 

De León, a native of Trujillo Alto, Puerto Rico, first won a world title when he faced the WBC world champion Marvin Camel on November 25, 1980, on the undercard of Sugar Ray Leonard and Roberto Durán's second fight in New Orleans.  De León outpointed Camel over fifteen rounds.  In a rematch later, De León knocked out Camel in eight rounds.  When his countryman Ossie Ocasio won the WBA world title, De León and Ocasio became the second pair of Puerto Ricans to share world titles in the same division at the same time; Alfredo Escalera and Samuel Serrano had achieved the feat in the 1970s in the junior lightweight division.

Taking loss 
De León lost his title in a shocking upset to former Gerry Cooney victim S. T. Gordon by a knockout in round two in Cleveland in 1982, and won a comeback fight versus former world heavyweight champion Leon Spinks by a knockout in round six in 1983.  After that, he and Gordon boxed a rematch in Las Vegas, and De León dropped Gordon once in the first round and once in the twelfth, en route to a unanimous decision win in a history-making bout: De León had now become the first boxer to win the world cruiserweight title twice.

Champion again 
He defended his title against Yaqui López by a knockout in four at San Jose, California, and with decisions over Anthony Davis and Bashiru Ali.  The Davis bout took place in Las Vegas and the fight with Ali was in Oakland, California.  De León next lost his title in Las Vegas to Alfonzo Ratliff in a decision.  Ratliff was in turn beaten by Bernard Benton, who defended against De León on March 22, 1986, once again in Las Vegas. De León joined the likes of Sugar Ray Robinson and Muhammad Ali in becoming one of the few boxers ever to win one division's world championship at least three times, defeating Benton by decision.

Once more 
He made a couple of defenses in Italy and then in 1988, he defended the title against Uruguayan José María Flores Burlón in Atlantic City, New Jersey, winning by twelve rounds in a unanimous decision but then he lost his titles in a unification bout with WBA and IBF world champion Evander Holyfield, by technical knockout in the eighth round, also in Las Vegas. But Holyfield soon left the division to pursue the world heavyweight championship, and De León was left with an open door to break his own record and win the title for a record fourth time.  He went to London, where he beat the WBC's number two ranked contender, Sammy Reeson, by a knockout in the ninth round, breaking his own record and was crowned world cruiserweight champion once again.

Holding on 
Carlos held on to the title for two years until finally losing it to Massimiliano Duran in Italy in an eleventh-round disqualification. He gained the title by his aforementioned win over Sammy Reeson. He made a defense by drawing with Johnny Nelson before the loss to Massimilano Duran mentioned earlier.

After boxing 
During the 1990s, De León ran afoul of the law a number of times, once while he was carrying a rifle. He worked on helping the professional boxing career of his son, prospect Carlos de León Jr.

He died on January 1, 2020, due to a cardiac arrest.  He was 60.

Professional boxing record

See also 

List of cruiserweight boxing champions
List of WBC world champions
List of Puerto Rican boxing world champions
List of Puerto Ricans

References

External links 

Carlos De León - CBZ Profile

|-

|-

|-

|-

|-

|-
 
|-

|-

1959 births
2020 deaths
People from Trujillo Alto, Puerto Rico
Cruiserweight boxers
World Boxing Council champions
Puerto Rican male boxers